Arthur Sousa Araújo (born 12 March 2003), known as Arthur Sousa, is a Brazilian footballer who plays as a forward for Corinthians.

Club career
Born in Brasília, Federal District, Arthur Sousa joined Corinthians' youth setup in 2019, from Desportivo Brasil. On 15 September 2022, he renewed his contract with the former until September 2025.

Arthur Sousa made his first team – and Série A – debut on 1 October 2022, coming on as a late substitute for goalscorer Róger Guedes in a 2–0 home win over Cuiabá.

Career statistics

References

2003 births
Living people
Footballers from Brasília
Brazilian footballers
Association football forwards
Campeonato Brasileiro Série A players
Sport Club Corinthians Paulista players